Grupo Habita is a boutique hotel developer-operator based in Mexico City that owns hotels across Mexico and several in the United States.

History
Grupo Habita was founded in 1994 by Moisés Micha and Carlos Couturier, and opened its first hotel in 2000, called Habita Hotel and located in Mexico City.

Hotels
Afterward, Grupo Habita expanded its base and established 13 hotels across Mexico, with its most notable and praised property, Downtown, in Mexico City. The company later started branching into the United States.

One of its hotels, Deseo, has been described as playing a crucial part in making the Playa del Carmen region of Mexico a hot spot for tourism.

In 2011, the firm opened its first U.S. property, a hotel called Hôtel Americano in the Chelsea neighborhood of Manhattan in New York City. This hotel is Grupo Habita's largest, with 56 rooms.

Grupo Habita's hotels have been described by observers as being excellent for younger travelers.

The group will operate a hotel in Chicago's Wicker Park, due to open in spring 2016.

In 2016 it also expressed an interest in opening a hotel in the Stockade District of Kingston, New York, a historic Hudson Valley city north of New York City that is fast becoming a cultural hot spot, with a large local hipster culture, a strong arts community and a vibrant nightlife.

References

Hotel chains in Mexico
Hotels in Mexico
Hotels in the United States
1994 establishments in Mexico